Chern Jenn-chuan (born 28 July 1954) is a Taiwanese businessman, academic, and politician. Dr. Jenn-Chuan Chern is a Professor Emeritus of Civil Engineering at National Taiwan University. He currently serves as the CEO of the Tang Prize Foundation, which is responsible for the planning and development of events associated with the Tang Prize. Dr. Chern has served in several important roles in the cabinet of the Executive Yuan of the Republic of China, Taiwan, such as Minister without Portfolio and Minister of the Public Construction Commission of the Executive Yuan . He was responsible for the promotion of sustainable public infrastructure, taking into consideration the needs of the environment, ecology, and disaster prevention.

Dr. Chern has assumed the roles of the deputy CEO and the CEO for the Morakot Post-Disaster Reconstruction Council from 2009 to 2014. Typhoon Morakot struck Taiwan on Aug. 8, 2009, bringing torrential rainfall that triggered flooding and landslides across central and southern Taiwan. Dr. Chern became an expert in hazard mitigation and post-disaster reconstruction in Taiwan. Due to his outstanding service in the cabinet, he received the first class medal of merit from the Executive Yuan of Taiwan. And in recognition of his outstanding contribution to the Typhoon Morakot Post-Disaster reconstruction, he received the Third Class Order of Brilliant Star with Violet Grand Cordon from the President in 2015.

Education 
Chern received his BS and MCE from civil engineering department from National Taiwan University and Rice University respectively, and  Ph.D. in civil engineering from Northwestern University in 1984. His interests include concrete materials & mechanics research, infrastructural development and management, hazard mitigation and post-disaster reconstruction etc.

Awards, honors and activities 
Dr. Chern is the recipient of many awards, including the Significant Contribution to 921 Chi-Chi Earthquake Reconstruction Award from the 921 Post-Disaster Recovery Commission of Cabinet: the 921 Earthquake New Campus Movement Contribution Award from the Ministry of Education. 

In 2008, he received the International Contribution Award from the Japan Society of Civil Engineers (JSCE). Dr. Chern also received the ACECC Civil Engineering Achievement Award in 2010 for his lifetime devotion and contributions to the world. In 2015, he received the Engineering Medal, the highest honor, from the Chinese Institute of Engineers (Taiwan). 

In addition, Dr. Chern plays an active role both locally and internationally on civil engineering and concrete societies. He is the past Chair of the Executive Committee of Asian Civil Engineering Coordinating Council (ACECC), past president of the International Society for Social Management Systems (SSMS), and the vice president of the Asian Concrete Federation (ACF). He was the past president of the Chinese Institute of Engineers (CIE), a leading engineering organization in Taiwan, and has served two terms as the president of the Chinese Institute of Civil and Hydraulic Engineering (CICHE) and is the founder and the first president of the Taiwan Concrete Institute (TCI). Dr. Chern is a fellow of American Concrete Institute (ACI), an vice-president and academician of the International Academy of Engineering (IAE) and foreign academician of the Russia Academy of Engineering (RAE). He is also a fellow and honorary member of CIE and CICHE, honorary member of Mongolian Association of Civil Engineers, honorary member both of Chinese Society of Structural Engineering (CSSE) and Asian Institute of Technology (AIT) Alumni Association in Taiwan.

1954 births
Living people
Rice University alumni
Political office-holders in the Republic of China on Taiwan
Politicians of the Republic of China on Taiwan from Kinmen County